Gordon Leslie "Billy" Hall (30 September 1915 – 28 June 2002) was an Australian rules footballer who played with Essendon and Fitzroy in the Victorian Football League (VFL).	He also played with Coburg in the Victorian Football Association (VFA).

Notes

External links 
Billy Hall's playing statistics from The VFA Project

Essendon Football Club past player profile

1915 births
2002 deaths
Australian rules footballers from Melbourne
Essendon Football Club players
Fitzroy Football Club players
Coburg Football Club players
People from Essendon, Victoria